Peter Montagna (born March 27, 1952) is an American make-up artist. He was nominated for an Academy Award in the category Best Makeup and Hairstyling for the film Hitchcock.

Selected filmography 
 Hitchcock (2012; co-nominated for an Oscar with Howard Berger and Martin Samuel)

References

External links 

1952 births
Living people
People from Brooklyn
American make-up artists